Buxton School is a private, coeducational, college preparatory, and boarding and day school for grades 9–12 located in Williamstown, Massachusetts, US. As of the 2015-2016 school year, the school had a student body of 78 students. By 2023, enrollment had dropped to at most 68 students.

History 
The school was founded by Ellen Geer Sangster in 1928 as a coeducational country day school in Short Hills, New Jersey. In 1947, the high school was moved to Sangster's family estate in Williamstown and formed anew as a boarding school. Nineteen students and many faculty followed Sangster from New Jersey to Williamstown's nascent boarding school. The primary and middle schools stayed in Short Hills as the newly formed Far Brook School. In 2023 the Buxton Administration announced a sale to the Clark Art Institute after Alumni sent out a letter informing the Alumni community of the backroom deal. Groups of Alumi formed to try and stop the sale and provide a different solution to the school's financial troubles.

Academics 
Available classes include: English, Spanish, American History, Ancient Greece and Rome, Sociology, World Religions, Algebra, Geometry, Pre-Calculus, Calculus, Multivariable calculus, Astronomy, Biology, Chemistry, Health, Marine Biology, Physics, The Practice of Poetry, Writing: Daily Themes, Drama, Music, Ceramics, Photography, Printmaking, Studio Art, Video Production, and more.

If students are interested in a subject that is not offered as a class, they can initiate an independent study with a faculty member relevant to their subject, or a teacher from outside. Private music lessons are offered. More advanced students can take more advanced science and math courses at Williams College, which is a mile away.

Graduates' requirements are based on a credit system:

The grading system is based on report conferences. Students are given grades for the purposes of college, but they are not allowed to see them until they are relevant to the student's college application process. Feedback from teachers is in the form of report letters and report conferences. Conversations and written assessments give the teacher and student a full understating of the student's performance in the class.

Campus 
Buxton occupies  of New England meadow and forest in the Berkshires of Western Massachusetts. Buildings on campus include the Main House, a girls' dorm, and where meals are served; The Boys' Dorm, affectionately called "The Barn" due to its history as a barn; The Classroom Building, which houses most of the classrooms on campus; the Arts complex which includes buildings for Photography, Studio Art, Music, and Ceramics; The Theater; The Library; and faculty houses.

Notable alumni

 Shari Belafonte, actress, model, and singer
 Max Cantor, actor and journalist
 John Cazale, actor known for The Godfather
 Charles Harrington Elster, author and radio commentator
 Barbara Bel Geddes, Golden Globe and Emmy award-winning actress and children's author
 Yasmin Aga Khan, philanthropist
 Christian Parenti, investigative journalist
 Peter Shumlin, 81st Governor of Vermont
 Justin Theroux, actor and screenwriter of films including Iron Man 2 and Zoolander 2
 Duncan Tonatiuh, award-winning children's book author
 Marco Williams, documentary filmmaker
 Frank Wood, Tony award-winning actor
Bill Blachly, director Vermont Theatre Festival Calais VT

References

External links
 Official website

1928 establishments in Massachusetts
Boarding schools in Massachusetts
Educational institutions established in 1928
Private high schools in Massachusetts
Private preparatory schools in Massachusetts
Schools in Berkshire County, Massachusetts
Williamstown, Massachusetts